Hugh I of Ponthieu, died circa 1000. He was also known as Hugo Miles. 

He was chosen by Hugh Capet, duke of France (not yet king), to be "advocate of the abbey of Saint-Riquier and castellan of Abbeville".  He also received Hugh Capet's daughter, Gisela, in marriage.

Hugh's origins are unknown, and the date which he received his fief is only "ascertainable within broad limits" as c. 980.  He is not known to have ever styled himself Count of Ponthieu.

Family
He married c. 994 Gisèle Capet, daughter of Hugh Capet and Adelaide of Aquitaine. His son Enguerrand I of Ponthieu was first to take the comital title after killing Arnold II of Boulogne in battle, sometime between 1024 and 1027, and marrying his widow.  Thus, the counts of Ponthieu, who figure prominently in early Norman history, were even newer to their status as landed lords than the Normans. Guy of Ponthieu was also his son: Guy de Ponthieu, ascendant de Guyonne d'Abbeville.

Sources
The Carmen de Hastingae Proelio of Bishop Guy of Amiens, edited by Catherine Morton and Hope Muntz, Oxford at the Clarendon Press, 1972.

External links
 Stoyan
 Comtes de Ponthieu & de Clermont

Counts of Ponthieu
970s births
1000s deaths
11th-century French people
10th-century French people